The following outline is provided as an overview of and topical guide to Mozambique:

Mozambique – sovereign country located in southeastern Africa bordered by the Indian Ocean to the east, Tanzania to the north, Malawi and Zambia to the northwest, Zimbabwe to the west and Eswatini and South Africa to the southwest. Mozambique was explored by Vasco da Gama in 1498 and colonized by Portugal in 1505. By 1510, the Portuguese had control of all of the former Arab sultanates on the east African coast. From about 1500, Portuguese trading posts and forts became regular ports of call on the new route to the east.

It is a member of the Community of Portuguese Language Countries and the Commonwealth of Nations. Mozambique (Moçambique) was named after Muça Alebique, a sultan.

General reference 

 Pronunciation: 
 Common English country name:  Mozambique
 Official English country name:  The Republic of Mozambique
 Common endonym(s):  
 Official endonym(s):  
 Adjectival(s): Mozambican
 Demonym(s):
 International rankings of Mozambique
 ISO country codes:  MZ, MOZ, 508
 ISO region codes:  See ISO 3166-2:MZ
 Internet country code top-level domain:  .mz

Geography 

Geography of Mozambique
 Mozambique is: a country
 Location:
 Eastern Hemisphere and Southern Hemisphere
 Africa
 East Africa
 Southern Africa
 Time zone:  Central Africa Time (UTC+02)
 Extreme points of Mozambique
 High:  Monte Binga 
 Low:  Mozambique Channel 0 m
 Land boundaries:  4,571 km
 1,569 km
 1,231 km
 756 km
 491 km
 419 km
 105 km
 Coastline:  2,470 km
 Population of Mozambique: 21,397,000  – 53rd most populous country

 Area of Mozambique: 801,590 km2
 Atlas of Mozambique

Environment 

 Climate of Mozambique
 Ecoregions in Mozambique
 Protected areas of Mozambique
 National parks of Mozambique
 Wildlife of Mozambique
 Fauna of Mozambique
 Birds of Mozambique
 Mammals of Mozambique
 List of non-marine molluscs of Mozambique, List of marine molluscs of Mozambique

Natural geographic features 

 Glaciers in Mozambique: none
 Rivers of Mozambique
 World Heritage Sites in Mozambique

Regions 

Regions of Mozambique

Ecoregions 

List of ecoregions in Mozambique
 Ecoregions in Mozambique

Administrative divisions 

Administrative divisions of Mozambique
 Provinces of Mozambique
 Districts of Mozambique
 Postos of Mozambique

Provinces 

Provinces of Mozambique

Districts 

Districts of Mozambique

Municipalities 

 Capital of Mozambique: Maputo
 Cities of Mozambique

Demography 

Demographics of Mozambique

Government and politics 

Politics of Mozambique
 Form of government: unitary semi-presidential representative democratic republic
 Capital of Mozambique: Maputo
 Elections in Mozambique
 Political parties in Mozambique

Branches of the government 

Government of Mozambique

Executive branch of the government 
 Head of state and head of government: President of Mozambique, Filipe Nyusi
 Cabinet of Mozambique
 Prime Minister of Mozambique, Carlos Agostinho do Rosário

Legislative branch of the government 
 Parliament of Mozambique: Assembly of the Republic (unicameral)

Judicial branch of the government 

Court system of Mozambique

Foreign relations 

Foreign relations of Mozambique
 Diplomatic missions in Mozambique
 Diplomatic missions of Mozambique

International organization membership 
The Republic of Mozambique is a member of:

African, Caribbean, and Pacific Group of States (ACP)
African Development Bank Group (AfDB)
African Union (AU)
Commonwealth of Nations
Comunidade dos Países de Língua Portuguesa (CPLP)
Food and Agriculture Organization (FAO)
Group of 77 (G77)
International Atomic Energy Agency (IAEA)
International Bank for Reconstruction and Development (IBRD)
International Civil Aviation Organization (ICAO)
International Criminal Court (ICCt) (signatory)
International Criminal Police Organization (Interpol)
International Development Association (IDA)
International Federation of Red Cross and Red Crescent Societies (IFRCS)
International Finance Corporation (IFC)
International Fund for Agricultural Development (IFAD)
International Hydrographic Organization (IHO)
International Labour Organization (ILO)
International Maritime Organization (IMO)
International Mobile Satellite Organization (IMSO)
International Monetary Fund (IMF)
International Olympic Committee (IOC)
International Organization for Migration (IOM) (observer)
International Organization for Standardization (ISO) (correspondent)
International Red Cross and Red Crescent Movement (ICRM)
International Telecommunication Union (ITU)

International Telecommunications Satellite Organization (ITSO)
International Trade Union Confederation (ITUC)
Inter-Parliamentary Union (IPU)
Islamic Development Bank (IDB)
Multilateral Investment Guarantee Agency (MIGA)
Nonaligned Movement (NAM)
Organisation internationale de la Francophonie (OIF) (observer)
Organisation of Islamic Cooperation (OIC)
Organisation for the Prohibition of Chemical Weapons (OPCW)
Southern African Development Community (SADC)
União Latina
United Nations (UN)
United Nations Conference on Trade and Development (UNCTAD)
United Nations Educational, Scientific, and Cultural Organization (UNESCO)
United Nations High Commissioner for Refugees (UNHCR)
United Nations Industrial Development Organization (UNIDO)
United Nations Mission in the Sudan (UNMIS)
United Nations Organization Mission in the Democratic Republic of the Congo (MONUC)
Universal Postal Union (UPU)
World Customs Organization (WCO)
World Federation of Trade Unions (WFTU)
World Health Organization (WHO)
World Intellectual Property Organization (WIPO)
World Meteorological Organization (WMO)
World Tourism Organization (UNWTO)
World Trade Organization (WTO)

Law and order 

Law of Mozambique
 Constitution of Mozambique
 Human rights in Mozambique
 LGBT rights in Mozambique
 Mozambique Republic Police

Military 

Military of Mozambique
 Command
 Commander-in-chief:
 Forces
 Army of Mozambique
 Air Force of Mozambique

Local government 

Local government in Mozambique

History 

History of Mozambique
Current events of Mozambique

Culture 

Culture of Mozambique
 Cuisine of Mozambique
 Languages of Mozambique
 Media in Mozambique
 National symbols of Mozambique
 Coat of arms of Mozambique
 Flag of Mozambique
 National anthem of Mozambique
 Prostitution in Mozambique
 Public holidays in Mozambique
 Religion in Mozambique
 Hinduism in Mozambique
 Islam in Mozambique
 Judaism in Mozambique
 World Heritage Sites in Mozambique

Art 
 Music of Mozambique

Sports 

Sports in Mozambique
 Football in Mozambique
 Mozambique at the Olympics

Economy and infrastructure 

Economy of Mozambique
 Economic rank, by nominal GDP (2007): 123rd (one hundred and twenty third)
 Agriculture in Mozambique
 Communications in Mozambique
 Internet in Mozambique
 Companies of Mozambique
Currency of Mozambique: Metical
ISO 4217: MZN
 Health care in Mozambique
 Mining in Mozambique
 Tourism in Mozambique
 Transport in Mozambique
 Airports in Mozambique
 Rail transport in Mozambique
 Water supply and sanitation in Mozambique

Education 

Education in Mozambique

See also 

Mozambique
Index of Mozambique-related articles
List of international rankings
List of Mozambique-related topics
Member state of the Commonwealth of Nations
Member state of the United Nations
Outline of Africa
Outline of geography

References

External links 

Constitution of Mozambique 
Mozambique – Travel guides at Wikivoyage
US State Dept. 1998 Human Rights Report – Mozambique
US State Dept. 2010 Human Rights Report – Mozambique

Mozambique